Solidago petiolaris is a North American species of goldenrod commonly called the downy ragged goldenrod. It is native to the United States and Mexico, in every coastal state from Texas to North Carolina, inland as far as southern Illinois, southern Nebraska, northeastern New Mexico, and Coahuila. Its preferred habitat is sandy areas.

Solidago petiolaris is a perennial herb up to 150 cm (5 feet) tall. One plant can produce 190 or more small yellow flower heads in late summer through fall.

References

External links
Photo of herbarium specimen at Missouri Botanical Garden, collected in Missouri in 1984

petiolaris
Flora of Coahuila
Flora of the United States
Plants described in 1789